Henri Rivière may refer to:

Henri Rivière (naval officer) (1827–1883), French naval commander involved in the conquest of northern Vietnam
Henri Rivière (painter) (1864–1951), French artist, designer and theatrical technician
Georges Henri Rivière (1897–1985), French museologist
Henri Rivière (bobsleigh) (born 1922), French Olympic bobsledder 
Henri Rivière (weightlifter), French Olympic weightlifter